Environmental Archaeology is an academic journal published by Maney Publishing on behalf of the Association for Environmental Archaeology.

The journal was established in 1996. It is edited by Dr. Tim Mighall of the University of Aberdeen.

References

External links 

Publications established in 1996
English-language journals
Biannual journals
Archaeology journals
Taylor & Francis academic journals
Academic journals associated with learned and professional societies